Dvori is a small settlement in the City Municipality of Koper in the Littoral region of Slovenia on the border with Croatia.

References

External links

Dvori on Geopedia

Populated places in the City Municipality of Koper